Joel Untersee (born 11 February 1994) is a South African-born Swiss footballer who plays as a defender.

Club career

Early career
Born in Johannesburg, South Africa, of Swiss descent, Untersee moved to Switzerland at a very young age and opted to represent Switzerland at various youth levels internationally. Following his move, Untersee joined the youth academy of FC Zürich, where he would eventually remain until 2010, before transferring to Italian giants, Juventus Football Club during the 2010–11 season.

Juventus
On 28 October 2010, Untersee officially left FC Zürich to join Juventus, where he was assigned to the youth team. After a successful debut season in Italy, Untersee was called up to the first team training camp in the summer 2011 by new head coach Antonio Conte. Following the summer ritiro, however, the young fullback returned to the youth sector for the 2011–12 season and remained during the 2012–13 campaign as well.

On 1 January 2014, Juventus confirmed that Untersee had left them for FC Vaduz on a six-month loan deal that would expire on 30 June 2014. Instantly making an impact with his new team, Untersee made his first appearance against FC Lugano in a 2–0 home victory on 3 February 2014. He went on to make 15 league appearances. Additionally, he scored his first goal for his new club in an 8–0 victory over FC Ruggell in the Liechtenstein Football Cup. On 3 July 2014, Juventus and Vaduz reached an agreement to prolong the loan deal for another season.

Brescia
On 31 August 2016, Untersee completed a move to Italian club Brescia on a loan deal from Juventus for the full season. He made his debut in a 2–0 Serie B win over Frosinone, playing the full 90 minutes

Empoli
After one year contract, in January 2019, he was loaned to Zürich until the end of the season.

HJK
On 19 January 2021, Untersee signed a one-year contract with HJK. Untersee left HJK on 23 July 2021 by mutual consent, having made four appearances for the club in the Finnish Cup.

International career
Untersee had represented Switzerland at youth levels.

On the 6 March 2018, the South African National Team Coach Stuart Baxter announced that Untersee has agreed to represent Bafana Bafana at international level. He explained his absence from the Bafana Bafana in the spring 2018 friendlies was due to Empoli's fixtures and the importance of achieving promotion.

In May 2019 he was added to South Africa's provisional 30-man squad for the Africa Cup of Nations, although he still had not obtained a South African passport by that time.

References

Living people
1994 births
Sportspeople from Johannesburg
Association football defenders
Swiss men's footballers
Juventus F.C. players
FC Vaduz players
Frosinone Calcio players
Brescia Calcio players
Empoli F.C. players
FC Zürich players
Swiss Super League players
Serie A players
Serie B players
Swiss expatriate footballers
Expatriate footballers in Italy
Expatriate footballers in Liechtenstein
Swiss expatriate sportspeople in Italy
Swiss expatriate sportspeople in Liechtenstein
South African people of Swiss descent
South African emigrants to Switzerland
Swiss people of South African descent